The Wessels mine is a mine located in the west of South Africa in Northern Cape. Wessels represents one of the largest manganese reserve in South Africa having estimated reserves of 198.8 million tonnes of manganese ore grading 55% manganese metal.

See also
Nchwaning mine
Gloria mine
Mamatwan mine

References 

Manganese mines
Manganese mines in South Africa
Economy of the Northern Cape